Tevita Tu'ifua (born 15 October 1975 in Nomuka) is a Tongan rugby union Wing and Centre. He is a member of the Tonga national rugby union team and participated with the squad at the 2007 Rugby World Cup.

Since 2013, he has acted as defence coach for the Tongan National team.

References

External links
Sporting Heroes Profile
Tevita Tuifua at New Zealand Rugby History

1975 births
Living people
Rugby union props
Tongan rugby union players
Tonga international rugby union players
People from Haʻapai